The Vicariate Apostolic of Ñuflo de Chávez is a Latin Church missionary ecclesiastical territory or apostolic vicariate of the Catholic Church in Bolivia. It is immediately exempt to the Holy See. Its cathedra is located in the episcopal see of Concepción, Santa Cruz.

History
On 13 December 1951 Pope Pius XII established the Vicariate Apostolic of Ñuflo de Chávez from the Vicariate Apostolic of Chiquitos.

Leadership
Jorge Kilian (Chiliano) Pflaum, O.F.M. † (16 November 1953 – 18 September 1971)
Antonio Eduardo Bösl, O.F.M. † (18 December 1972 – 13 October 2000)
Bonifacio Antonio Reimann Panic, O.F.M. (31 October 2001 – Present)

See also
Roman Catholicism in Bolivia

Sources

Apostolic vicariates
Roman Catholic dioceses in Bolivia
Christian organizations established in 1951
1951 establishments in Bolivia
Roman Catholic ecclesiastical provinces in Bolivia